Laverne Joseph Torczon or LaVerne Joseph Torczon, also known as Tarzan Torczon, (January 1, 1936 – April 18, 2015) was an American football defensive end. He played college football at the University of Nebraska, and played professionally in the American Football League for the Buffalo Bills, the New York Titans/Jets, and the Miami Dolphins.  He was the Sporting News selection as an AFL All-League defensive end in 1960 and played in the 1961 AFL All-Star game.

See also
Other American Football League players

References

External links
Torczon's 1962 Fleer football card
Bio from 1964 New York Jets yearbook

1936 births
2015 deaths
People from Columbus, Nebraska
Players of American football from Nebraska
American football defensive ends
Nebraska Cornhuskers football players
Buffalo Bills players
New York Titans (AFL) players
New York Jets players
Miami Dolphins players
American Football League All-Star players
American Football League All-League players
American Football League players